Bari Sud Est is a railway station in Bari, Italy. It is located on the Bari–Martina Franca–Taranto railway. The train services and the railway infrastructure are operated by Ferrovie del Sud Est.

Train services
The station is served by the following service(s):

Local services (Treno regionale) Bari - Conversano - Putignano - Martina Franca
Local services (Treno regionale) Bari - Casamassima - Putignano

References

Railway stations in Apulia
Buildings and structures in the Province of Bari